Emil Barja (born 7 November 1991) is an Icelandic basketball player for Haukar of the Úrvalsdeild karla and a member of the Icelandic national basketball team. He won the Icelandic championship in 2019 as a member of KR.

Career
Emil came up through junior ranks of Haukar and played his first senior games during the 2007-2008 season. In 2013, he helped Haukar win 1. deild karla and gain promotion to Úrvalsdeild karla.

Emil had his best statistical season in 2013–2014, averaging 9.9 points, 8.0 rebounds and 6.9 assists. In 2014–2015, he finished second in the league in assists, behind Pavel Ermolinskij, with 7.0 assists per game, while also posting 10.9 points and 6.9 rebounds per game, and was named to the Úrvalsdeild All-first team for the second half of the season. Haukar finished with the third best record in the league and made it to the semi-finals where they lost to Tindastóll 3-1.

He averaged 9.2 points and 5.6 assists in 2016–2017 in a disappointing season for Haukar who avoided relegation by winning their last three games.

During the 2017–2018 season, Emil helped Haukar post the best record in the league for the first time in its history.
On 19 July 2018, Emil left Haukar, where he had trained since the age of six, and signed a two-year contract with reigning national champions KR. On 4 May 2019 he won his first national championship after KR beat ÍR in the Úrvalsdeild finals 3-2.

In May 2019, Emil returned to Haukar, signing á two year contract.

National team career
On 1 September 2018, he was selected to the Icelandic national team for its upcoming games against Norway. He played his first game for Iceland on 2 September, posting 2 points, 9 rebounds and 6 assists in a 71-69 victory against Norway.

References

External links
Icelandic statistics 2008-present at kki.is
Profile at realgm.com

1991 births
Living people
Emil Barja
Point guards
Emil Barja
KR men's basketball players
Haukar men's basketball players